Šiškovci  is a village in Croatia.

References

Populated places in Vukovar-Syrmia County
Populated places in Syrmia